Federico Sevieri (born 19 March 1991) is an Italian professional football player who plays for Serie D club Cynthialbalonga.

Career

Club career
He made his debut for the Lazio main squad on 17 December 2009 when he started in an 2009–10 UEFA Europa League game against PFC Levski Sofia. In mid-2010 he was sold to Lumezzane in co-ownership deal.

Sevieri joined Sporting Città di Fiumicino in the Eccellenza Lazio Girone A, a regional league on the fifth level of Italian football, in the summer 2015. In 2016, Sporting Città di Fiumicino merged with Pol.D. Fregene and became to SFF Atletico. In the summer 2019, the club merged again, this time with Atletico Fiuggi Terme and was then named A.S.D. Atletico Terme Fiuggi. He played under all three mergers.

In December 2019, Sevieri moved to Serie D club Albalonga.

References

External links

1991 births
Living people
Italian footballers
Association football midfielders
S.S. Lazio players
F.C. Lumezzane V.G.Z. A.S.D. players
Alma Juventus Fano 1906 players
Latina Calcio 1932 players
Serie C players
Serie D players